The New Society for Visual Arts (Neue Gesellschaft für Bildende Kunst or nGbK) is a German art association, which was established in 1969. It is headquartered in the Berlin district of Kreuzberg, Germany.

History
The New Society for Visual Arts was created in 1969 after the dissolution of the German Society of Fine Arts.

Program
nGbK exhibition program is well known for its political and social engagement, as well as for being decided on through direct democratic way with votes of members on annual assemblies. Unlike most German art associations, nGbK members themselves (also with non-members) set up working groups of 5 or more  and then submit projects to be presented and voted on. If an application is approved and project selected, it is executed in the next year program or for longterm projects in the next two years. nGbK working group losses its active status after the completion of the project. This basic principle distinguishes this from the other major German art associations, where usually the members have no direct influence on exhibition planning.

Before moving to its current headquarters at Oranienstraße 25 in Kreuzberg, the organization's exhibition space was at Tempelhofer Ufer 22.

Archived information of the projects and some of the publications are compiled and available online.

Structure
 Presiding:
 Ingo Arend, Katrin Busch, Çağla İlk and representatives of working groups
 Managing director:
 Annette Maechtel, from January 2020  
 2015–2019 (resigned) Lilian Engelmann
 2015 (interim director) Oliver Baurhenn

References

External links
  

1969 establishments in Germany
Arts organizations established in 1969
Organisations based in Berlin
German artist groups and collectives
Clubs and societies in Germany
Arts in Berlin
Friedrichshain-Kreuzberg